Early English may refer to:

Early English Period, a style of architecture
Old English, a stage in the development of the English language

See also
Early Modern English
Middle English
History of the English language